Newry is a town in Victoria, Australia, located on Newry - Boisdale Road, north west of Maffra, in the Shire of Wellington. The town had a population in 2016 of 427 people.

History
The first survey of the area was conducted in 1860 by W. Dawson. A fresh survey was conducted in 1861 by C. P. Rafferty in 1861, and further surveying was performed by G. Hastings in 1863. The survey by Rafferty set aside occupied land for a township reserve, which was surveyed into blocks by G.T. Jones in 1867. 16 blocks were sold in 1867, and blocks were sold again in 1871.

The Post Office opened on 1 February 1869 as Upper Maffra and was renamed Maffra Upper in 1889 and Newry in 1894.
A brick church was built in 1885.

Sport
Golfers play at the course of the Newry Golf Club on Three Chain Road.

Notable people
 Craig Huffer, Sub 4-minute miler
 Bill Young, VFL footballer & Coleman Medalist

References

Towns in Victoria (Australia)
Shire of Wellington